Sai Kung Town or simply Sai Kung is a town on the Sai Kung Peninsula, facing Sai Kung Hoi (Inner Port Shelter), part of Sai Kung District in the New Territories, Hong Kong. Sai Kung is the central hub of nearby surrounding villages, and hence the name may also refer to the areas in its immediate surroundings.

Name
Despite in modern transliteration,  usually meaning city, in Classical Chinese,  and  both mean market. The word  was also used by the colonial British government to transliterate the word Town, as in, for example, Tai Po Town.

The name Sai Kung first appeared in Western publications dating back to the early 1900s, but the settlement was at that time only described as "the village of Sai Kung". Sai Kung also probably first appeared on the map of the Xin'an County, made by Simeone Volonteri in 1866. The origins of the name Sai Kung are unknown. Moreover, there are criticisms of the accuracy of Volonteri's map in general, particularly as regards specific place names, such as Green Hill, which historically known as Tuen Mun Hill.

History
According to Professor , no market was recorded where modern day Sai Kung District is today in the Qing dynasty's Xin'an Xianzhi, either in the Kangxi edition (1688) nor in the Jiaqing edition (1819). Instead, Faure stated that, due to inaccessibility of land-based transport, Leung Shuen Wan was probably developed into a moorage inlet in the 18th century. Shops were opened on Leung Shuen Wan Island (known in English as the High Island, though this is not within the modern boundary of Sai Kung Town), as well as a Tin Hau Temple, for the boat people that lived on their boats. Objects in the Temple dated back to the year 1741 of the western calendar.

Faure also stated that market(s) on Sai Kung Peninsula was/were founded before the signing of the Convention for the Extension of Hong Kong Territory in 1898, which ceded the whole Peninsula to the Hong Kong colony as the New Territories and New Kowloon. In the early 1900s, the Sai Kung market had expanded to 50 shops, plus 4 boat-building sheds. At the same time, a smaller market of 18 shops existed in Hang Hau. (Hang Hau became part of the built-up area of Tseung Kwan O New Town, and not part of Sai Kung Town.)

There were no proper educational centres in Sai Kung Peninsula at that time, as traditional study halls were located in the smaller villages. However, the Catholic Church of Hong Kong had established a primary school there at the end of the 19th century, which taught a Western curriculum in the market town. The colonial British government also established a police station and a dispensary near the market.

During World War I, ships were required to be inspected by the Royal Navy when entering or leaving Victoria Harbour. The Port Shelter and Sai Kung market town were located outside the harbour and thus benefited from the policy by becoming places for resupply. A temple inside the Sai Kung market town also became the local civic centre for the settlement of disputes. The shop owners, who were not from the surrounding villages, even acted as representatives for Sai Kung in Heung Yee Kuk in the 1920s. Heung Yee Kuk represented the interests of the rural villages of the New Territories and was recognized by the colonial government as a consulting institution. However, in the 1930s, the local merchants formed their own chamber of commence and gradually took over political influence in the market town. Nowadays, however, the Heung Yee Kuk seat for the Sai Kung Central constituency is elected by the local residents of the town through universal suffrage. The rural villages surrounding the town still elect their own representatives to Heung Yee Kuk.

According to another author, Sai Kung market town expanded economically in the 1950s. At the time, the world was enforcing an embargo policy on the newly established People's Republic of China, and the market town became a place for smuggling goods to the Republic.

Sai Kung town underwent significant expansion during the 1970s when the High Island Reservoir and its associated water management schemes required some villagers and fishermen to be rehoused in Sai Kung. This provided a core of government-funded new development, both housing and commercial, in the town centre. This was followed by the Tui Min Hoi (literally 'over the harbour') development under the government's market town programme.

Before the relocation of the airport of Hong Kong from Kai Tak to Chek Lap Kok, the town was a popular residential area for airport staff from all over the world.

The town is next to Sai Kung Hoi, which was a fishing harbour. The harbour is now a typhoon shelter, where motorized junks used in the local tourist trade are moored. They are boats that can be hired for fishing and swimming trips.

Boundaries
The statutory boundary of the town was regulated by urban zoning plan Sai Kung Town Outline Zoning Plan (OZP), which was prepared in the 2000s, and approved circa 2006. However, in election, the town is served by the constituency Sai Kung Central, which roughly cover the same area as the OZP.

The statutory boundaries of the town are Hiram's Highway, Po Tung Road and Tai Mong Tsai Road in the north and west. In the south, the town is bordered by the conservation area Tsiu Hang Special Area, as well as Pak Sha Wan Peninsula. In the east, the coastline served as the boundary.

Climate

Public housing

Tui Min Hoi Chuen is a public housing estate in Tui Min Hoi, developed by Hong Kong Housing Society. It is the first rural public housing estate developed by Hong Kong Housing Society. It consists of 4 blocks of 5-storey buildings completed in 1984, 1985 and 1986 respectively.

Lakeside Garden is primarily a subsidised private housing estate and Flat-for-Sale Scheme estate on the reclaimed land. It is the third rural housing scheme developed by Hong Kong Housing Society. It consists of ten private residential blocks and one rental residential block, completed in 1997. The rental block provides affordable rental housing similar to those of Hong Kong Housing Authority.

Transport
Sai Kung Town is primarily served by double-decker buses, public light buses and green taxis. There is no MTR link to Sai Kung Town. Ferry services are available to the neighbouring islands and isolated coastal villages in the Sai Kung Hoi, as well as to the public golf course on one of the nearby islands.

Media
Sai Kung is served by Sai Kung & Clearwater Bay Magazine, a free-distribution English language monthly magazine and the community website Saikung.com.

Education
Sai Kung is in Primary One Admission (POA) School Net 95. Within the school net are multiple aided schools (operated independently but funded with government money) and one government school: Tseung Kwan O Government Primary School (將軍澳官立小學).

The Hong Kong Academy (Early Childhood, Primary & Secondary) is located in Sai Kung.

Sai Kung Sung Tsun Catholic School (Primary Section & Secondary Section) is also located in Sai Kung.

See also
 Man Yee Wan New Village
 Sha Tsui New Village

References

External links

 Delineation of area of existing village Hoi Pong Street (Sai Kung) for election of resident representative (2019 to 2022)
 Delineation of area of existing village Main Street (East) (Sai Kung) for election of resident representative (2019 to 2022)
 Delineation of area of existing village Main Street (West) (Sai Kung) for election of resident representative (2019 to 2022)
 Delineation of area of existing village Po Tung Road (East) (Sai Kung) for election of resident representative (2019 to 2022)
 Delineation of area of existing village Po Tung Road (West) (Sai Kung) for election of resident representative (2019 to 2022)
 Delineation of area of existing village Sai Kung Road (North) (Sai Kung) for election of resident representative (2019 to 2022)
 Delineation of area of existing village Sai Kung Road (South) (Sai Kung) for election of resident representative (2019 to 2022)
 Delineation of area of existing village See Cheung Street (Sai Kung) for election of resident representative (2019 to 2022)
 Delineation of area of existing village Tai Street (East) (Sai Kung) for election of resident representative (2019 to 2022)
 Delineation of area of existing village Tai Street (West) (Sai Kung) for election of resident representative (2019 to 2022)
 Delineation of area of existing village Tak Lung Back Street (Sai Kung) for election of resident representative (2019 to 2022)
 Delineation of area of existing village Tak Lung Front Street (Sai Kung) for election of resident representative (2019 to 2022)

 
Hakka culture in Hong Kong